Bernardo Provenzano (31 January 1933 – 13 July 2016) was an Italian mobster and chief of the Sicilian Mafia clan known as the Corleonesi, a Mafia faction that originated in the town of Corleone, and de facto the boss of bosses (il capo dei capi). His nickname was Binnu u tratturi (Sicilian for "Bernie the tractor") because, in the words of one informant, "he mows people down." Another nickname was il ragioniere ("the accountant") due to his apparently subtle and low-key approach to running his crime empire, at least in contrast to some of his more violent predecessors.

Provenzano was part of the Corleonesi Mafia clan who backed mob boss Luciano Leggio in the ambush and murder of Michele Navarra in the late 1950s. In 1963, Provenzano became a fugitive after a failed hit. Provenzano also participated in the Viale Lazio massacre in the late 1960s. Salvatore Riina succeeded Leggio in the mid 1970s, and Provenzano became the second in command of the Corleonesi. Provenzano took the reins after Riina and Bagarella's arrests, but the three had been already sentenced to life in absentia in the late 1980s as part of the Maxi Trial and the 1990s for the two high-profile bombings (the Capaci massacre and Via D'Amelio massacre) that killed prosecutors Giovanni Falcone and Paolo Borsellino. After 43 years living as a fugitive, he was captured in 2006, and subjected to the stringent Article 41-bis prison regime until his death on 13 July 2016.

Early years
Provenzano was born the third of seven children on 31 January 1933, in Corleone, Sicily, to farmers Angelo Provenzano and Giovanna Rigoglioso. It was during this period that a series of illegal activities began, especially cattle raiding and the theft of foodstuffs. In August 1958, Provenzano was one of the 14 gunmen who backed mob boss Luciano Leggio in the ambush and murder of Michele Navarra. Leggio subsequently became the head of the Family. Over the next five years, Provenzano helped Leggio hunt down and kill many of Navarra's surviving supporters. In September 1963, Provenzano became a fugitive after a failed killing on one of Navarra's men – at this point, he didn't run from the police but from Mafia vendetta. Leggio said of Provenzano: "He shoots like an angel but has the brains of a chicken." On 10 September 1963, an arrest warrant was issued against Provenzano for the murder of one of Navarra's men.

Provenzano participated in the Viale Lazio massacre on 10 December 1969: the killing of Michele Cavataio for his role in the First Mafia War. 
The attack nearly went wrong, as Cavataio was able to shoot to death Calogero Bagarella, before Provenzano killed him with a Beretta 38/A submachine gun and earned himself a reputation as a Mafia killer with the attack. However, according to Gaetano Grado, one of the participants who turned government witness later, it was Provenzano who botched the attack, shooting too early.

Leggio was captured by police in 1974, and Salvatore Riina was effectively left in charge. Provenzano became the second in command of the Corleonesi, Riina's right-hand man.

Fugitive and later years
In 1981, Provenzano and Riina unleashed the so-called Second Mafia War, with which they eliminated rival bosses and established a new "Commission", composed only of capomandamenti; during the meetings of the "Commission", Provenzano participated in the decisions and the organization of numerous murders as an influential exponent of the district of Corleone and repeatedly protected, with intimidation, the political career of Vito Ciancimino, the main political referent of the Corleonesi.

In 1993 after Riina’s arrest, in a meeting at Villabate it was decided that both Bernardo Provenzano and Leoluca Bagarella took charge of holding Corleone's mandate together.
But after the Bagarella's arrest in 1995, Provenzano took the reins of the Corleonesi and all of Cosa Nostra, however he was already sentenced to life in absentia in 1987 at the Maxi Trial

Provenzano was given a life sentence for each of anti-mafia magistrates Falcone's and Borsellino's murders in 1992, in 1997 and 1999 respectively.

Evasion and capture

Provenzano frowned upon the use of telephones and issued orders and communications (even to his family) through small, hand-delivered notes called pizzini. Many of the notes from Provenzano that police have intercepted sign off with religious blessings, such as one that concluded "May the Lord bless and protect you." According to mob godmother-turned-informant Giuseppina Vitale, Provenzano had appeared at a 1992 Cosa Nostra summit meeting dressed in the purple robes of a Catholic bishop.
Religious behaviour and language progressively became the prominent features of Provenzano's figure. For example, Provenzano systematically underlined verses from the Bible and took notes of relevant passages to be threaded in his pizzini through otherwise routine instructions regarding daily business matters. He also recurrently thanked 'Our Lord Jesus Christ', and referred to 'The Divine Providence' and 'Our beloved Lord', expressing the hope that 'He might help us to do the right things'. In particular, the expression Con il volere di Dio (With God's will), to date has been counted 43 times, and it often appears more than once in the same piece of communication.

Provenzano used a version of the Caesar cipher, used by Julius Caesar in wartime communications. The Caesar code involves shifting each letter of the alphabet forward three places; Provenzano's pizzini code did the same, then replaced letters with numbers indicating their position in the alphabet. For example, one reported note by Provenzano read "I met 512151522 191212154 and we agreed that we will see each other after the holidays..." This name was decoded as "Binnu Riina".

In October 2003, Provenzano was driven to France, allegedly by Villabate mobster Salvatore Troia, to undergo prostate surgery at a private clinic near Marseille. Provenzano was also provided with fake travel and medical records, under the name of Salvatore Troia's father, Gaspare Troia, a Sicilian baker. Mario Cusimano, another Villabate mobster who was later arrested, began to collaborate with police in 2005, and revealed to the investigators that the identity card used by Provenzano to go to Marseille had been stamped by Francesco Campanella, former president of the municipal council of Villabate, and in September 2005, Campanella also began to collaborate with police who confirmed that he was the one who had stamped the document. The Italian State Police were able to create a photofit of Provenzano based on the descriptions of informants, as well as doctors and nurses at the Marseilles clinic where Provenzano was admitted for surgery.

On 25 January 2005, police raided various homes in Sicily and arrested 46 Mafia suspects believed to be helping Provenzano elude the authorities. Although they did not catch the elusive Mafia boss himself, investigators nonetheless unearthed evidence that the 72-year-old Provenzano was still very much alive and in control of the Mafia, in the form of his cryptic handwritten notes, his preferred method of giving orders to his men. Two months later, another raid took place. It resulted in the capture over 80 Mafiosi, though Provenzano was not one of them.

Provenzano had been a fugitive from the law since 1963. Until his arrest, the only known photographs of him were taken during the 1950s; the last-known photo was taken in 1959: a serious youth with greased hair wearing a suit for a saint's festival. Provenzano was finally captured on 11 April 2006, by the Italian police near his home town, Corleone. A spokesman for the Palermo police, Agent Daniele Macaluso, said Provenzano had been arrested during the morning near Corleone, 60 km south of Palermo and was being driven back to the Sicilian capital. The police were able to pinpoint Provenzano's exact location by the simplest of connections; they tracked a delivery of clean laundry from his family to his farmhouse hide-out.

After his arrest
After his arrest, he was held at the maximum security prison in Terni, and subjected to the Article 41-bis prison regime. After one year, he was transferred to a prison in Novara where he tried several times to communicate through pizzini. The Ministry of Justice then decided to apply "special surveillance" on Provenzano.

In total, Provenzano was given 20 life sentences plus 49 years and one month, and solitary confinement for 33 years and six months.

After the arrest of Provenzano, Salvatore Lo Piccolo and Matteo Messina Denaro were thought to be the new leaders of Cosa Nostra. However, about 350 pizzini were found at Provenzano's hide-out, some of which had indicated that Provenzano's joint deputies in Palermo were Salvatore Lo Piccolo and Antonio Rotolo, capomandamento of Pagliarelli, a Corleonesi loyalist in the days of Totò Riina. In a message referring to an important decision for Cosa Nostra, Provenzano told Rotolo: "It's up to you, me and Lo Piccolo to decide this thing."

Anti-Mafia prosecutor Antonio Ingroia of the Direzione distrettuale antimafia (DDA) of Palermo said that it was unlikely that there would be an all-out war over who would fill Provenzano's shoes. "Right now I don't think that's probable," he said. Of the two possible successors, Ingroia thought Lo Piccolo was the more likely heir to the Mafia throne. "He's from Palermo, and that's still the most powerful Mafia stronghold," Ingroia said.

Two months after Provenzano's arrest, on 20 June 2006, authorities issued 52 arrest warrants against the top echelon of Cosa Nostra in the city of Palermo (Operation Gotha).
In November 2009, Massimo Ciancimino, the son of former mayor of Palermo Vito Ciancimino, said that Provenzano betrayed the whereabouts of Riina. Police sent Vito Ciancimino maps of Palermo. One of the maps was delivered to Provenzano, then a Mafia fugitive. Ciancimino said the map was returned by Provenzano who indicated the precise location of Riina's hiding place.

On 19 March 2011, it was confirmed that Provenzano was suffering from bladder cancer, and was transferred from Novara to a prison in Parma; on 9 May 2012, he attempted suicide by putting his head in a plastic bag, with the aim of suffocation, but was foiled when it was observed by a prison police officer.

On 9 April 2014, he was admitted into the San Paolo Hospital in Milan.

List of trials
 In 1987, in the Maxi Trial, Provenzano was sentenced in absentia to life imprisonment together with 18 other mob bosses.
In 1995, in the trial for the murder of Lieutenant Colonel Giuseppe Russo, Provenzano was sentenced in absentia to life imprisonment together with Salvatore Riina, Michele Greco and Leoluca Bagarella.
The same year, in the trial for the murders of the commissioners Beppe Montana and Antonino Cassarà, he was also sentenced in absentia to life imprisonment together with Michele Greco, Bernardo Brusca, Francesco Madonia and Salvatore Riina.
The same year, in the trial for the murders of Piersanti Mattarella, Pio La Torre, Rosario di Salvo and Michele Reina, in which he was given a further life sentence in absentia together with Michele Greco, Bernardo Brusca, Salvatore Riina, Giuseppe Calò, Francesco Madonia and Nenè Geraci.
The same year, in the trial for the murder of General Carlo Alberto Dalla Chiesa, Boris Giuliano, and Paolo Giaccone, Provenzano was sentenced to life imprisonment in absentia together with Salvatore Riina, Giuseppe Calò, Bernardo Brusca, Francesco Madonia, Nenè Geraci and Francesco Spadaro.
In 1997, in the trial for the Capaci massacre in which the judge Giovanni Falcone, his wife Francesca Morvillo and their escort of Antonio Montinaro, Vito Schifani and Rocco Di Cillo, lost their lives, Provenzano was sentenced to life imprisonment in absentia together with the bosses Salvatore Riina, Pietro Aglieri, Bernardo Brusca, Giuseppe Calò, Raffaele Ganci, Nenè Geraci, Benedetto Spera, Nitto Santapaola, Salvatore Montalto, Giuseppe Graviano, Matteo Motisi.
The same year, in the trial for the murder of Judge Cesare Terranova, Provenzano received another life sentence in absentia along with Michele Greco, Bernardo Brusca, Giuseppe Calò, Nenè Geraci, Francesco Madonia and Salvatore Riina.
In 1999, Provenzano was sentenced to life imprisonment in absentia in the trial against those responsible for the Via D'Amelio massacre, in which the judge Paolo Borsellino and five of his escort men lost their lives; together with him the bosses Giuseppe "Piddu" Madonia, Nitto Santapaola, Giuseppe Calò, Giuseppe Farinella, Raffaele Ganci, Nino Giuffrè, Filippo Graviano, Michelangelo La Barbera, Giuseppe Montalto, Salvatore Montalto, Matteo Motisi, Salvatore Biondo, Cristoforo Cannella, Domenico Ganci and Stefano Ganci.
In 2000, he was sentenced in absentia to life imprisonment together with Giuseppe Graviano, Leoluca Bagarella and Salvatore Riina for the 1993 bombings including Via dei Georgofili, in Florence, Milan and Rome.
In 2002, Provenzano was sentenced in absentia to life imprisonment for the murder of judge Rocco Chinnici together with the bosses Salvatore Riina, Raffaele Ganci, Antonino Madonia, Salvatore Buscemi, Nenè Geraci, Giuseppe Calò, Francesco Madonia, Salvatore and Giuseppe Montalto, Stefano Ganci and Vincenzo Galatolo.
In 2003, Provenzano was sentenced in absentia to life imprisonment for the murder of Mario Francese.
In 2009, he received another life sentence together with Salvatore Riina for the Viale Lazio massacre and the death of Michele Cavataio.

Family
Provenzano had been romantically linked to Saveria Benedetta Palazzolo, a woman from Mafia family from Cinisi; the couple had two children, Angelo Provenzano and Francesco Paolo Provenzano. Palazzolo and her children lived in hiding until 1992; then, in the spring of that year, they suddenly returned to Corleone.

Angelo had been a tour guide in Palermo, speaking about Sicilian Mafia history. Francesco Paolo graduated in 2005 with a doctorate in Modern Languages and Cultures at the University of Palermo.

Death
On 13 July 2016, Provenzano died in Milan from complications from bladder cancer at San Paolo Hospital, aged 83. Refused a public funeral by the church and Palermo police chief, Provenzano was cremated in Milan, and on 18 July, his ashes were buried in his family tomb in a cemetery in his hometown of Corleone.

In popular culture
Il fantasma di Corleone, a 2006 film by Marco Amenta;
L'ultimo dei Corleonesi, a 2007 film by Alberto Negrin where Provenzano is played by David Coco;
Scacco al re - La cattura di Provenzano, a 2007 documentary series;
Il Capo dei Capi, a 2007 TV series by Enzo Monteleone and Alexis Sweet, where Provenzano is played by Salvatore Lazzaro;
L'ultimo padrino, a 2008 two-part television miniseries by Marco Risi, where Provenzano is played by Michele Placido.

References

External links
Dickie, John (2004). Cosa Nostra. A history of the Sicilian Mafia, London: Coronet, 
Jamieson, Alison (2000). The Antimafia. Italy's fight against organized crime, London: MacMillan Press Ltd  
Longrigg, Clare (2009), Boss of Bosses: How One Man Saved The Sicilian Mafia, London: John Murray, 
 Oliva, Ernesto & Salvo Palazzolo (2001). L’altra mafia: Biografia di Bernardo Provenzano, Soveria Mannelli (CZ): Rubbettino Editore.
Stille, Alexander (1995).Excellent Cadavers. The Mafia and the Death of the First Italian Republic, New York:  Vintage 

  A biography of Provenzano
 The Guardian: Gangster No 1, 24 April 2001
 Time Europe Magazine: Sicily's Invisible Man, 29 August 2004
 Profile from the BBC, 11 April 2006
 Experts: Provenzano capture not the end of the Sicilian mob, by Eric J. Lyman, USA Today, 12 April 2006
 Prosecutors fear capture of mafia boss will spark bloody war of succession, by John Hooper, The Guardian, 13 April 2006
 The Sopranos? No, the Shepherds, by Federico Varese, The Times, 14 April 2006
 In search of the real Godfather, by Peter Popham, The Independent, 4 June 2006

1933 births
2016 deaths
Capo dei capi
Corleonesi
Deaths from cancer in Lombardy
Deaths from bladder cancer
Fugitives
Fugitives wanted by Italy
Italian crime bosses
Italian Roman Catholics
Sicilian Mafia Commission
Sicilian mafiosi
Sicilian mafiosi sentenced to life imprisonment
Italian people convicted of murdering police officers